Mama is the debut studio extended play (EP) by South Korean-Chinese boy band Exo-K and Exo-M. It was  released by SM Entertainment on April 9, 2012, in two language editions – Exo-K's Korean version and Exo-M's Mandarin version.

Background
The EP was produced by Lee Soo-man, who is also the main producer for the group. The title for the EP is a Korean term used to address to a royal person, similar to the attributes  "your highness" or "your majesty" in English. The title single "Mama" is written by Yoo Young-jin, who also co-wrote two other singles from the EP, "What Is Love" and "History".

Promotion
From December 2011 to February 2012, SM Entertainment released twenty-three teaser trailers featuring the members of the group, which included some previews of the songs from the EP. The track "Angel" is used as background music in four teaser trailers. The track "Two Moons"  is featured in Teaser #12, which starred Exo-K's Kai and Exo-M's Lay. "Machine" is featured in Teaser #5, starring Kai. The track "What is Love" is featured in two teaser trailers.

Exo-K promoted the title track "Mama" on music shows, along with track "History". They made their debut at music shows including SBS's Inkigayo, Mnet's M! Countdown, KBS's Music Bank and MBC's Show! Music Core from April 8 to April 15, while Exo-M performed at China's 12th Yinyue Fengyun Bang Awards that same day. Exo-K promoted the album by performing "Mama" on Korean music shows every week. Exo-M supported the album by being billed as the supporting artist on the Indonesian leg of Super Junior's Super Show 4 concert tour, and made consistent appearances on Chinese televised music programs and variety shows, including a guest appearance on an episode of Happy Camp.

Release and reception
The group's prologue single, "What Is Love" was released on January 30, 2012. A second prologue single, "History" was released on March 9.

On March 31, 2012, SM Entertainment unveiled a teaser trailer for the music video of the EP's title single, "Mama" at Exo's concert showcase in Seoul, South Korea. On April 6, the company released the album jacket photos for both of Exo-K and Exo-M's albums. The EP was released on April 9, 2012, simultaneously in China, South Korea, and the international iTunes Store.

Both versions of the EP were a commercial success; Exo-K's version reached to number one on South Korea's Gaon Album Chart, number four on China's Sina Album Chart, and debuted at number eight on the Billboard World Albums Chart. Exo-M's version reached to number one on China's Sina Album Chart, number four on the Gaon Album Chart, and number twelve on the Billboard World Albums Chart. All three singles by Exo-M were charted in various Chinese music and video charts, with the EP's title single topping the charts after one day of release. The music videos for all three singles peaked at number one on Chinese streaming websites, while Exo-K's "Mama" reached number seven on YouTube's Global Chart.

Singles

"What is Love"
"What is Love" was released for digital download from the iTunes Store and other Korean and mainland Chinese online retailers on January 30, 2012. The Korean version is performed by D.O. and Baekhyun of subgroup Exo-K and the Mandarin version by Chen and Lu Han of Exo-M. The two music videos of the song were released on YouTube on the same day the song was made available for download. Each music video, though recorded in two different versions, featured all twelve members of Exo. The music videos consists of the combined video teasers that were previously released by the company.

"History"
"History" was digitally released on March 9, 2012, in both Korean and Mandarin. The Korean version is performed by subgroup Exo-K and the Mandarin version by Exo-M. The music videos of the song were released on YouTube on March 8, 2012, one day before the song was made available for download through iTunes and other Korean and mainland Chinese online retailers. Both music videos featured all twelve members of Exo dancing in a windy, rocky setting and a bright blue studio.

"History" debuted at number 27 on China's Sina New Singles Chart and ultimately reached to number six. On the Sina Hot Singles Chart, the song debuted at number 64 and peaked at number 14. In South Korea, "History" peaked at number 86.

Track listing
Credits adapted from Naver

Charts

Sales

Release history

Awards and nominations

References

2012 EPs
Exo EPs
Korean-language EPs
SM Entertainment EPs
KMP Holdings EPs
EMI Records EPs